The 25th Mieczysław Połukard Criterium of Polish Speedway League Aces was the 2006 version of the Mieczysław Połukard Criterium of Polish Speedway Leagues Aces. It took place on April 2 in the Polonia Stadium in Bydgoszcz, Poland.

Starting positions draw 

 Robert Kościecha - Budlex-Polonia Bydgoszcz
 Roman Chromik - RKM Rybnik
 Krzysztof Kasprzak - Unia Leszno
 Wiesław Jaguś - Adriana Toruń
 Piotr Protasiewicz - Budlex-Polonia Bydgoszcz
 Krzysztof Buczkowski - Budlex-Polonia Bydgoszcz
 Piotr Świst - TŻ Lublin
 Robert Klecha - Budlex-Polonia Bydgoszcz
 Sebastian Ułamek - Złomrex-Włókniarz Częstochowa
 Roman Povazhny - RKM Rybnik
 Maciej Kuciapa - Marma Polskie Folie Rzeszów
 Karol Ząbik - Adriana Toruń
 Sławomir Drabik - Złomrex-Włókniarz Częstochowa
 Robert Sawina - Budlex-Polonia Bydgoszcz
 Adrian Miedziński - Adriana Toruń
 Tomasz Gapiński - Atlas Wrocław
 Marcin Jędrzejewski - Budlex-Polonia Bydgoszcz

Heat details

Notes

Sources 
 Roman Lach - Polish Speedway Almanac

See also 

Criterium of Aces
Mieczysław Połukard Criterium of Polish Speedway Leagues Aces